These are the squads for the 2006 FIFA Club World Cup, which was held in Japan from 10 December to 17 December 2006.

Al Ahly
Head coach:  Manuel José de Jesus

Auckland City FC
Head coach:  Allan Jones

Club América
Head coach:  Luis Fernando Tena

FC Barcelona
Head coach:  Frank Rijkaard

Jeonbuk Hyundai Motors
Head coach:  Choi Kang-Hee

SC Internacional
Head coach:  Abel Braga

References

External links
 
 
 
 

Squads
FIFA Club World Cup squads